Kim Won-il (born 1942) is a South Korean writer.

Kim Won-il may also refer to:
Kim Won-il (boxer) (born 1982), South Korean boxer
Kim Won-il (footballer) (born 1986), South Korean footballer